Ascute is a genus of calcareous sponges. It contains two species, both found in Australia:

 Ascute asconoides (Carter, 1886)
 Ascute uteoides (Dendy, 1893)

References

 
Taxa named by Arthur Dendy